Kimbirila-Sud is a town in north-western Ivory Coast. It is a sub-prefecture of Samatiguila Department in Kabadougou Region, Denguélé District.

Kimbirila-Sud was a commune until March 2012, when it became one of 1126 communes nationwide that were abolished.

References

Sub-prefectures of Kabadougou
Former communes of Ivory Coast